Cistus populifolius is a shrubby species of flowering plant in the family Cistaceae.

Phylogeny
Cistus populifolius belongs to the white and whitish pink flowered clade of Cistus species.

References

populifolius
Taxa named by Carl Linnaeus